Corporate alumnus (/əˈlʌmnəs/ (masculine) or alumna (/əˈlʌmnə/ (feminine) of an organization is a former employee of the organization. The term "Corporate" is prefaced to recognize the difference from "Alumni" who are graduates or former students of universities, colleges and schools.

Corporate Alumni Programs are commonplace among larger organizations in niche labor fields with a primary focus on boomerang hires.

Corporate Alumni became a recognized organizational value by Reid Hoffman, founder of LinkedIn in his book The Alliance and has become a newsworthy subject since 2016. In 2018 Deloitte released their annual business transformation report that recognized "The Employee Experience Doesn't End At The Exit Interview"

The PayPal Mafia is a term generally used to discuss the Corporate Alumni of PayPal, many have gone on to achieve incredible success.

Examples of noteworthy Corporate Alumni Programs include: P&G, HSBC, Nestle, Accenture, McKinsey and Pearson and professional services organizations such as McKinsey & Co are often cited in the news for their prominent Alumni which includes CEO's of organizations including Google, Morgan Stanley, Boeing among others.

References 

 
Alumni associations